This article details events occurring in the year 1839 in India. Major events include the reduction of the Khanate of Kalat to a subsidiary ally of the British, and the capture of Aden in Yemen by the East India Company, creating an important stopover for voyages between Europe and India.

Incumbents
The Earl of Auckland, Governor-General, 1836-42.
Alexander Cunningham, aide-de-camp to Lord Auckland, 1836-1840
Sir John Keane, Lieutenant-General of the Bombay Army, 1834-1840
Zirat Prasad, regent of Bhaisunda, 1829-1840
Nau Nihal Singh, Maharaja of the Sikh Empire, 1839-1840
Bhao Rao Phanse, Dewan of Indore State, 1839-1840
Raghuji Bohonsle III, Maratha of Nagpur, 1818-1853
Gaya Prasad, Chaube of Taraon State, 1812-1840
Anand Rao Puar "Rao Sahib", Raja of Dewas State, 1817-1840
Dariao Singh, Rao of Paldeo, 1812-1840
Shiv Saran Singh, Rana of Baghal State, 1828-16 January 1840
Jashwant Singh, Raja of Nabha State, December 1783-21 May 1840
Kandhaji IV, Thakur Sahib of Palitana State, 1820-1840
Nonghanji IV, Thakur Sahib of Palitana State, 1824-1860
Henry Fane, Commander-in-Chief, India, 1835-1839
Gaya Prasad, Chaube of Taraon State
Anand Rao Puar "Rao Sahib", Raja of Dewas State
Shiv Saran Singh, Rana of Baghal State
Jashwant Singh, Raja of Nabha State
Ahmed Shah, King of the Maqpon dynasty
Chandrasinhji II Kesarisinhji, Maharana Raj Sahib of the Wankaner State, 1787-1839
Vakhatsinhji Chandrasinhji, Maharana Raj Sahib of the Wankaner State, 1839-1842
Ranjit Singh, founder and Maharajah of the Sikh Empire, 1780-1839
Kharak Singh, Maharajah of the Sikh Empire, 1839-1840
Jashwant Singh, Rana of Alirajpur State, 1818-17 March 1862
Raja Zalim Sen, Raja of Mandi State, 1826-1839
Raja Balbir Sen, Raja of Mandi, 1839-1851
Bhup Deo, Raja of Kanker State, 1818-1839
Padma Deo, Raja of Kanker State, 1839–1853
Major-General William Henry Sleeman heads the Thuggee and Dacoity Department from February 1839
Thug Behram, ruler of a Thugee death cult

Events
First Anglo-Afghan War, 1837–1842
Battle of Ghazni, part of the First Anglo-Afghan War, occurs on 23 July 1839 in Ghazni, Afghanistan
East India Company forces capture Aden to provide a coaling station for ships en route to India, founding the Aden Colony
Khanate of Kalat is reduced to a subsidiary alliance with the British Empire, self-governing under Khans
British India Society is founded in England
Jessop & Company work on construction of the first iron bridge in British India, Loha-ka-Pul over River Gomti at Lucknow, 1812–1840
36th Jacob's Horse, a unit cavalry of the British Indian Army, is established
Feast of Saint Raphael, Ollur is held for the first time in Ollur, near Thrissur, Kerala
The cornerstone for St. Paul's Cathedral, Kolkata is laid
Bishop Hodges Higher Secondary School is established
St. Mary's Anglo-Indian Higher Secondary School is established
St. Paul's Church, Landour is established
Thomas John Newbold is appointed deputy assistant adjutant-general and postmaster to the field force of the East India Company
John Nicholson, then a cadet in the East India Company's Bengal Infantry, reaches India
Sambad Prabhakar, a weekly newspaper, became a daily newspaper
The Statue of Thomas Munro was shipped to Madras
 Mr. Grange (Sub Assistant to the Commissioner at Nowgong) lead the first expedition to the Naga Hills (Mezoma and Khonoma)

Law
Interest Act

Births
July - Baba Jaimal Singh, Founder of Radha Soami Satsang Beas (died 29 December 1903).
Allan Webb in Calcutta, second Bishop of Bloemfontein, baptised on 17 November
William Francis Frederick Waller, recipient of the Victoria Cross, born at Dagoolie, India on 20 August 1839
Hanson Jarrett, recipient of the Victoria Cross, on 22 March in Madras
Hugh Shaw, recipient of the Victoria Cross, on 4 February in Madras
Jamsetji Tata, pioneer industrialist, who founded the Tata Group, India's biggest conglomerate company, on 3 March in Navsari, Baroda, Bombay Presidency

Deaths
Ranjit Singh, first Maharajah of the Sikh Empire, on 27 June 1839 in Lahore, Punjab, Sikh Empire
Sankara Varman, astronomer-mathematician belonging to the Kerala school of astronomy and mathematics
George Havell, a painter
Chandrasinhji II Kesarisinhji, Maharana Raj Sahib of the Wankaner State
Jean-François Allard, French soldier and adventurer, in Punjab, Sikh Empire
William Francklin, English orientalist and army officer, on 12 April
Raja Zalim Sen, Raja of Mandi State, died in June 1839
Bhup Deo, Raja of Kanker State

References

 
India
Years of the 19th century in India